France competed at the 1896 Summer Olympics in Athens, Greece, from 6 to 15 April 1896. French athletes had appeared in every Summer Olympic Games of the modern era, alongside Australia, Great Britain, and Greece. France won the fourth-most gold medals with 5 and the fourth-most total medals with 11.  Cycling was the sport in which the French competitors had the most success, as they completely dominated the field.  The French team had 27 entries in 18 events, winning 11 medals.

Medalists

Multiple medalists
The following competitors won multiple medals at the 1896 Olympic Games.

Competitors

| width=78% align=left valign=top |
The following is the list of number of competitors in the Games.

| width="22%" align="left" valign="top" |

Athletics

The five French athletes won 2 medals between them. Tuffère appears to have entered the 100 metres but not started; some sources have André Tournois in the first heat of the 100 metres instead of Grisel. Grisel entered the triple jump, but did not start.

Track & road events

Field events

Cycling

France dominated the cycling events, taking 4 of the 6 gold medals.  Three were won by Paul Masson who won every event he entered, with Léon Flameng adding the fourth as well as a silver and a bronze.  One of the two won each event that a Frenchman contested; the two gold medals won by other countries were in competitions that Masson and Flameng did not enter.

Track

Fencing

The French fencers were held in high regard prior to the Games; Gravelotte and Callot validated those expectations in the amateur foil competition.  Each went undefeated in their pool, advancing to face each other in the final.  Gravelotte won the first-to-3 bout. Surprisingly, however, Perronet lost to the Greek Leonidas Pyrgos in the only match of the masters competition.

Gymnastics

Grisel competed in the parallel bars in the gymnastics program.  The competitions had no formal scoring, the judges merely selecting the winner and runner-up.  Grisel was neither in this competition.

Artistic

Shooting

Lermusiaux entered the military rifle event in the shooting program.  His score and placing are unknown.

Tennis

Only the first initial and last name of the French tennis player in 1896 is known. He was defeated in the first round of the singles tournament.

References

  (Digitally available at )
  (Excerpt available at )
 

Nations at the 1896 Summer Olympics
1896
Olympics